Kasper Hvidt (born 6 February 1976 in Copenhagen) is a Danish retired handball goalkeeper, who lastly played for KIF Kolding and previous Danish national team. He was selected as the best keeper for the 2008 European Men's Handball Championship. .

, he is Director of Sports at Astralis Group, the group behind Astralis and Origen.

References

1976 births
Living people
Danish male handball players
Danish expatriate sportspeople in Spain
FC Barcelona Handbol players
Liga ASOBAL players
Olympic handball players of Denmark
Handball players at the 2008 Summer Olympics
CB Ademar León players
SDC San Antonio players
Handball players from Copenhagen